Hattie McDaniel (June 10, 1893October 26, 1952) was an American actress, singer-songwriter, and comedian. For her role as Mammy in Gone with the Wind (1939), she won the Academy Award for Best Supporting Actress, becoming the first African American to win an Oscar. She has two stars on the Hollywood Walk of Fame, was inducted into the Black Filmmakers Hall of Fame in 1975, and in 2006 she became the first Black Oscar winner honored with a U.S. postage stamp. In 2010, she was inducted into the Colorado Women's Hall of Fame. In addition to acting, McDaniel recorded 16 blues sides between 1926 and 1929 and was a radio performer and television personality; she was the first Black woman to sing on radio in the United States. Although she appeared in more than 300 films, she received on-screen credits for only 83. Her best known other major films are Alice Adams, In This Our Life and Since You Went Away.

McDaniel experienced racism and racial segregation throughout her career, and was unable to attend the premiere of Gone with the Wind in Atlanta because it was held at a whites-only theater. At the Oscars ceremony in Los Angeles, she sat at a segregated table at the side of the room. In 1952, McDaniel died due to breast cancer. Her final wish to be buried in Hollywood Cemetery was denied due to the graveyard being restricted to whites-only at the time.

Early life
McDaniel, the youngest of 13 children, was born in 1893 to formerly-enslaved parents in Wichita, Kansas. Her mother, Susan Holbert, was a singer of gospel music, and her father, Henry McDaniel, fought in the Civil War with the 122nd United States Colored Troops. In 1900, the family moved to Fort Collins, Colorado and then to Denver, Colorado.

Hattie attended Denver East High School (1908–1910). In 1908, she entered a contest sponsored by the Women’s Christian Temperance Union, reciting "Convict Joe", later claiming she had won first place. 

Her brother, Sam McDaniel, played the butler in the 1948 Three Stooges' short film Heavenly Daze. Her sister Etta McDaniel was also an actress.

Career

Early work and acting beginnings
McDaniel was a songwriter as well as a performer. She honed her songwriting skills while working with her brother Otis McDaniel's carnival company, a minstrel show. McDaniel and her sister Etta Goff launched the McDaniel Sisters Company, an all-female minstrel show in 1914. After the death of her brother Otis in 1916, the troupe began to lose money, and Hattie did not get her next big break until 1920. From 1920 to 1925, she appeared with Professor George Morrison's Melody Hounds, a Black touring ensemble. In the mid-1920s, she embarked on a radio career, singing with the Melody Hounds on station KOA in Denver. From 1926 to 1929, she recorded many of her songs for Okeh Records and Paramount Records in Chicago. McDaniel recorded seven sessions: one in the summer of 1926 on the rare Kansas City label Meritt; four sessions in Chicago for Okeh from late 1926 to late 1927 (of the 10 sides recorded, only four were issued), and two sessions in Chicago for Paramount in March 1929.

After the stock market crashed in 1929, McDaniel could only find work as a washroom attendant at Sam Pick's Club Madrid near Milwaukee. Despite the owner's reluctance to let her perform, she was eventually allowed to take the stage and soon became a regular performer.

In 1931, McDaniel moved to Los Angeles to join her brother Sam, and sisters Etta and Orlena. When she could not get film work, she took jobs as a maid or cook. Sam was working on a KNX radio program, The Optimistic Do-Nut Hour, and was able to get his sister a spot. She performed on radio as "Hi-Hat Hattie", a bossy maid who often "forgets her place". Her show became popular, but her salary was so low that she had to keep working as a maid. She made her first film appearance in The Golden West (1932), in which she played a maid. Her second appearance came in the highly successful Mae West film I'm No Angel (1933), in which she played one of the maids with whom West camped it up backstage. She received several other uncredited film roles in the early 1930s, often singing in choruses. In 1934, McDaniel joined the Screen Actors Guild. She began to attract attention and landed larger film roles, which began to win her screen credits. Fox Film Corporation put her under contract to appear in The Little Colonel (1935), with Shirley Temple, Bill "Bojangles" Robinson, and Lionel Barrymore.

Judge Priest (1934), directed by John Ford and starring Will Rogers, was the first film in which she played a major role. She had a leading part in the film and demonstrated her singing talent, including a duet with Rogers. McDaniel and Rogers became friends during filming. In 1935, McDaniel had prominent roles, as a slovenly maid in Alice Adams (RKO Pictures); a comic part as Jean Harlow's maid and traveling companion in China Seas (MGM) (McDaniels's first film with Clark Gable); and as the maid Isabella in Murder by Television, with Béla Lugosi. She appeared in the 1938 film Vivacious Lady, starring James Stewart and Ginger Rogers. McDaniel had a featured role as Queenie in the 1936 film Show Boat (Universal Pictures), starring Allan Jones and Irene Dunne, in which she sang a verse of Can't Help Lovin' Dat Man with Dunne, Helen Morgan, Paul Robeson, and a Black chorus. She and Robeson sang "I Still Suits Me", written for the film by Kern and Hammerstein. After Show Boat, she had major roles in MGM's Saratoga (1937), starring Jean Harlow and Clark Gable; The Shopworn Angel (1938), with Margaret Sullavan; and The Mad Miss Manton (1938), starring Barbara Stanwyck and Henry Fonda. She had a minor role in the Carole Lombard–Frederic March film Nothing Sacred (1937), in which she played the wife of a shoeshine man (Troy Brown) masquerading as a sultan.

McDaniel was a friend of many of Hollywood's most popular stars, including Joan Crawford, Tallulah Bankhead, Bette Davis, Shirley Temple, Henry Fonda, Ronald Reagan, Olivia de Havilland, and Clark Gable. She starred with de Havilland and Gable in Gone with the Wind (1939). Around this time, she was criticized by members of the Black community for the roles she accepted and for pursuing roles aggressively rather than rocking the Hollywood boat. For example, in The Little Colonel (1935), she played one of the servants longing to return to the Old South, but her portrayal of Malena in RKO Pictures' Alice Adams angered white Southern audiences, because she stole several scenes from the film's white star, Katharine Hepburn. McDaniel ultimately became best known for playing a sassy, opinionated maid.

Gone with the Wind

The competition to win the part of Mammy in Gone with the Wind was almost as fierce as that for Scarlett O'Hara. First Lady Eleanor Roosevelt wrote to film producer David O. Selznick to ask that her own maid, Elizabeth McDuffie, be given the part. McDaniel did not think she would be chosen because she had earned her reputation as a comic actress. One source claimed that Clark Gable recommended that the role be given to McDaniel; in any case, she went to her audition dressed in an authentic maid's uniform and won the part.

Loew's Grand Theater on Peachtree Street in Atlanta, Georgia was selected by the studio as the site for the Friday, December 15, 1939, premiere of Gone with the Wind.  Studio head David O. Selznick asked that McDaniel be permitted to attend, but MGM advised him not to, because of Georgia's segregation laws. Clark Gable threatened to boycott the Atlanta premiere unless McDaniel were allowed to attend, but McDaniel convinced him to attend anyway.

Most of Atlanta's 300,000 citizens crowded the route of the seven-mile (11 km) motorcade that carried the film's other stars and executives from the airport to the Georgian Terrace Hotel, where they stayed. While Jim Crow laws kept McDaniel from the Atlanta premiere, she did attend the film's Hollywood debut on December 28, 1939. Upon Selznick's insistence, her picture was also featured prominently in the program.

Reception and 1939 Academy Awards

For her performance as the house servant who repeatedly scolds her owner's daughter, Scarlett O'Hara (Vivien Leigh), and scoffs at Rhett Butler (Clark Gable), McDaniel won the 1939 Academy Award for Best Supporting Actress, the first Black actor to have been nominated and win an Oscar. "I loved Mammy," McDaniel said when speaking to the white press about the character. "I think I understood her because my own grandmother worked on a plantation not unlike Tara". Her role in Gone with the Wind had alarmed some whites in the South; there were complaints that in the film she had been too "familiar" with her white owners. At least one writer pointed out that McDaniel's character did not significantly depart from Mammy's persona in Margaret Mitchell's novel, and that in both the film and the book, the much younger Scarlett speaks to Mammy in ways that would be deemed inappropriate for a Southern teenager of that era to speak to a much older white person, and that neither the book nor the film hints of the existence of Mammy's own children (dead or alive), her own family (dead or alive), a real name, or her desires to have anything other than a life at Tara, serving on a slave plantation. Moreover, while Mammy scolds the younger Scarlett, she never crosses Mrs. O'Hara, the more senior white woman in the household. Some critics felt that McDaniel not only accepted the roles but also in her statements to the press acquiesced in Hollywood's stereotypes, providing fuel for critics of those who were fighting for Black civil rights. Later, when McDaniel tried to take her "Mammy" character on a road show, Black audiences did not prove receptive.

While many Black people were happy over McDaniel's personal victory, they also viewed it as bittersweet. They believed Gone With the Wind celebrated the slave system and condemned the forces that destroyed it. For them, the unique accolade McDaniel had won suggested that only those who did not protest Hollywood's systemic use of racial stereotypes could find work and success there.

The Twelfth Academy Awards took place at the Coconut Grove Restaurant of the Ambassador Hotel in Los Angeles. It was preceded by a banquet in the same room. Louella Parsons, an American gossip columnist, wrote about Oscar night, February 29, 1940:

She and her escort were required to sit at a segregated table for two at the far wall of the room; her white agent, William Meiklejohn, sat at the same table. The hotel had a strict no-Blacks policy, but allowed McDaniel in as a favor. The discrimination continued after the award ceremony as well as her white co-stars went to a "no-Blacks" club, where McDaniel was also denied entry. Another Black woman did not win an Oscar again for 50 years, with Whoopi Goldberg winning Best Supporting Actress for her role in Ghost. Weeks prior to McDaniel winning her Oscar, there was even more controversy. David Selznick, the producer of Gone With the Wind, omitted the faces of all the Black actors on the posters advertising the movie in the South. None of the Black cast members were allowed to attend the premiere for the film.

Gone with the Wind won eight Academy Awards. It was later named by the American Film Institute (AFI) as number four among the top 100 American films of all time in the 1998 ranking and number six in the 2007 ranking.

Final works
In the Warner Bros. film In This Our Life (1942), starring Bette Davis and directed by John Huston, McDaniel once again played a domestic, but one who confronts racial issues when her son, a law student, is wrongly accused of manslaughter. McDaniel was in the same studio's Thank Your Lucky Stars (1943), with Humphrey Bogart and Bette Davis. In its review of the film, Time wrote that McDaniel was comic relief in an otherwise "grim study", writing, "Hattie McDaniel, whose bubbling, blaring good humor more than redeems the roaring bad taste of a Harlem number called Ice Cold Katie". McDaniel continued to play maids during the war years for Warners in The Male Animal (1942) and United Artists' Since You Went Away (1944), but her feistiness was toned down to reflect the era's somber news. She also appeared as a maid in Janie (1944) and played the role of "Aunt Tempy", a maid in Song of the South (1946) for Disney.

She made her last film appearances in Mickey (1948) and Family Honeymoon (1949), where that same year, she appeared on the live CBS television program The Ed Wynn Show. She remained active on radio and television in her final years, becoming the first black actor to star in her own radio show with the comedy series Beulah. She also starred in the television version of the show, replacing Ethel Waters after the first season. (Waters had apparently expressed concerns over stereotypes in the role.) Beulah was a hit, however, and earned McDaniel $2,000 per week; however, the show was controversial. In 1951, the United States Army ceased broadcasting Beulah in Asia because troops complained that the show perpetuated negative stereotypes of black men as shiftless and lazy and interfered with the ability of black troops to perform their mission. After filming a handful of episodes, however, McDaniel learned she had breast cancer. By the spring of 1952, she was too ill to work and was replaced by Louise Beavers.

Personal life

Marriages
McDaniel married Howard Hickman on January 19, 1911, in Denver, Colorado. He died in 1915. Her second husband, George Langford, died of a gunshot wound in January 1925, soon after she married him and while her career was on the rise.

She married James Lloyd Crawford, a real estate salesman, on March 21, 1941, in Tucson, Arizona. According to Donald Bogle, in his book Bright Boulevards, Bold Dreams, McDaniel happily confided to gossip columnist Hedda Hopper in 1945 that she was pregnant. McDaniel began buying baby clothes and set up a nursery in her house. Her plans were shattered when she suffered a false pregnancy and fell into a depression. She never had any children. She divorced Crawford in 1945, after four and a half years of marriage. Crawford had been jealous of her career success, she said.

She married Larry Williams, an interior decorator, on June 11, 1949, in Yuma, Arizona, but divorced him in 1950 after testifying that their five months together had been marred by "arguing and fussing". McDaniel broke down in tears when she testified that her husband tried to provoke dissension in the cast of her radio show and otherwise interfered with her work. "I haven't gotten over it yet", she said. "I got so I couldn't sleep. I couldn't concentrate on my lines".

Community service

During World War II, she served as chairman of the Negro Division of the Hollywood Victory Committee, providing entertainment for soldiers stationed at military bases. (The US military was segregated, and black entertainers were not allowed to serve on white entertainment committees.) She elicited the help of a friend, the actor Leigh Whipper, and other black entertainers for her committee. She made numerous personal appearances at military hospitals, threw parties, and performed at United Service Organizations (USO) shows and war bond rallies to raise funds to support the war on behalf of the Victory Committee. Bette Davis was the only white member of McDaniel's acting troupe to perform for black regiments; Lena Horne and Ethel Waters also participated. McDaniel was also a member of American Women's Voluntary Services.

She joined the actor Clarence Muse, one of the first black members of the Screen Actors Guild, in an NBC radio broadcast to raise funds for Red Cross relief programs for Americans that had been displaced by devastating floods, and she gained a reputation for generosity, lending money to friends and strangers alike.

Death

In August 1950, McDaniel entered the hospital with a heart ailment. She was released in October to recuperate at home, and was reported on January 3, 1951, as showing "slight improvement in her recovery from a mild stroke".
She died of breast cancer on October 26, 1952, in the hospital of the Motion Picture House in Woodland Hills, California. She was survived by her brother Sam McDaniel. Thousands of mourners turned out to celebrate her life and achievements.

McDaniel had wished to be buried in Hollywood Cemetery,

which however had a whites-only policy at the time;
she was buried instead in Rosedale Cemetery, her second choice.
In 1999, Hollywood Cemetery offered to have McDaniel re-interred there, but after her family declined the offer the cemetery erected a cenotaph (now one of Hollywood's most popular tourist attractions) overlooking its lake.

McDaniel's last will and testament of December 1951 bequeathed her Oscar to Howard University, where she had been honored by the students with a luncheon after she had won her Oscar. At the time of her death, McDaniel would have had few options. Very few white institutions in that day preserved black history. Historically, black colleges had been where such artifacts were placed. Despite evidence McDaniel had earned an excellent income as an actress, her final estate was less than $10,000. The IRS claimed the estate owed more than $11,000 in taxes. In the end, the probate court ordered all of her property, including her Oscar, sold to pay off creditors. Years later, the Oscar turned up where McDaniel wanted it to be: Howard University, where, according to reports, it was displayed in a glass case in the university's drama department. However, it appears to have gone missing from Howard in the 1960s or 1970s and has never been recovered.

Reception and impact

African American politics
As her fame grew, McDaniel faced growing criticism from some members of the black community. Groups such as the NAACP complained that Hollywood stereotypes not only restricted black actors to servant roles but often portrayed them as lazy, dim-witted, satisfied with lowly positions, or violent. In addition to addressing the studios, they called upon actors, and especially leading black actors, to pressure studios to offer more substantive roles and at least not pander to stereotypes. They also argued that these portrayals were unfair as well as inaccurate and that, coupled with segregation and other forms of discrimination, such stereotypes were making it difficult for all black people, not only actors, to overcome racism and succeed in the entertainment industry. Some attacked McDaniel for being an "Uncle Tom"—a person willing to advance personally by perpetuating racial stereotypes or being an agreeable agent of offensive racial restrictions. McDaniel characterized these challenges as class-based biases against domestics, a claim that white columnists seemed to accept. She reportedly said, "Why should I complain about making $700 a week playing a maid? If I didn't, I'd be making $7 a week being one".

Unlike many other black entertainers, she was not associated with civil rights protests and was largely absent from efforts to establish a commercial base for independent black films. She did not join the Negro Actors Guild of America until 1947, late in her career. McDaniel hired one of the few white agents who would represent black actors at the time, William Meiklejohn, to advance her career. Her avoidance of political controversy was deliberate. When columnist Hedda Hopper sent her Richard Nixon placards and asked McDaniel to distribute them, McDaniel declined, replying she had long ago decided to stay out of politics. "Beulah is everybody's friend," she said. Since she was earning a living honestly, she added, she should not be criticized for accepting such work as was offered. Her critics, especially Walter White of the NAACP, claimed that she and other actors who agreed to portray stereotypes were not a neutral force but rather willing agents of black oppression.

McDaniel and other black actresses and actors feared that their roles would evaporate if the NAACP and other Hollywood critics complained too loudly. She blamed these critics for hindering her career and sought the help of allies of doubtful reputation. After speaking with McDaniel, Hopper claimed that McDaniel's career troubles were not the result of racism but had been caused by McDaniel's "own people".

Achievements and legacy

McDaniel has two stars on the Hollywood Walk of Fame in Hollywood: one at 6933 Hollywood Boulevard for her contributions to radio and one at 1719 Vine Street for motion pictures. In 1975, she was inducted posthumously into the Black Filmmakers Hall of Fame.

In 1994 the actress and singer Karla Burns, notably the first black performer to win a Laurence Olivier Award, launched her one-woman show Hi-Hat-Hattie (written by Larry Parr), about McDaniel's life. Burns went on to perform the role in several other cities through 2018, including Off-Broadway and the Long Beach Playhouse Studio Theatre in California.

In 2002, McDaniel's legacy was celebrated in American Movie Classics's (AMC) film Beyond Tara, The Extraordinary Life of Hattie McDaniel (2001), produced and directed by Madison D. Lacy and hosted by Whoopi Goldberg. This one-hour special depicted McDaniel's struggles and triumphs in the presence of rampant racism and brutal adversity. The film won the 2001–2002 Daytime Emmy Award, presented on May 17, 2002, for Outstanding Special Class Special.

McDaniel was the 29th inductee in the Black Heritage Series by the United States Postal Service. Her 39-cent stamp was released on January 29, 2006, featuring a 1941 photograph of McDaniel in the dress she wore to accept the Academy Award in 1940. The ceremony took place at the Margaret Herrick Library of the Academy of Motion Picture Arts and Sciences, where the Hattie McDaniel collection includes photographs of McDaniel and other family members as well as scripts and other documents.

In 2004 Rita Dove, the first black U.S. poet laureate, published her poem "Hattie McDaniel Arrives at the Coconut Grove" in The New Yorker and has since presented it frequently during her poetry readings as well as on YouTube.

In 2010, Mo'Nique, the winner of the Oscar for Best Supporting Actress in Precious, wearing a blue dress and gardenias in her hair, as McDaniel had at the ceremony in 1940, in her acceptance speech thanked McDaniel "for enduring all that she had to so that I would not have to".

In the 2020 Netflix mini-series Hollywood, a fictionalized Hattie McDaniel is played by Queen Latifah.

Whereabouts of the McDaniel Oscar

The whereabouts of McDaniel's Oscar are currently unknown.
In 1992, Jet magazine reported that Howard University could not find it and alleged that it had disappeared during protests in the 1960s.
Since the matter has become one of public discussion, in 1998 Howard University faced a barrage of negative press charging that it negligently “lost” the Oscar or, alternatively, allowed it to be stolen.
In 2007, an article in The Huffington Post repeated rumors that the Oscar had been cast into the Potomac River by angry civil rights protesters in the 1960s. The assertion reappeared in The Huffington Post under the same byline in 2009.

In November 2011, W. Burlette Carter, of the George Washington University Law School, published the results of her year-and-a-half-long investigation into the Oscar's fate. Howard could find no official records of receipt. Carter rejected claims that students had stolen the Oscar (and thrown it in the Potomac River) as wild speculation or fabrication that traded on long-perpetuated stereotypes of blacks. She questioned the sourcing of The Huffington Post stories. Instead, she argued that the Oscar had likely been returned to Howard University's Channing Pollack Theater Collection between the spring of 1971 and the summer of 1973 or had possibly been boxed and stored in the drama department at that time. The reason for its removal, she argued, was not civil rights unrest but rather efforts to make room for a new generation of black performers. If neither the Oscar nor any paper trail of its ultimate destiny can be found at Howard today, she suggested, inadequate storage or record-keeping in a time of financial constraints and national turbulence may be blamed. She also suggested that a new generation of caretakers may have failed to realize the historic significance of the award.

Homeowners' covenant case victory

McDaniel was the most famous of the black homeowners who helped to organize the black Historic West Adams neighborhood residents who saved their homes. Loren Miller, an attorney and the owner and publisher of the California Eagle newspaper, represented the minority homeowners in their restrictive covenant case. In 1944, Miller won the case Fairchild v Rainers, a decision in favor of a black family in Pasadena, California, which had bought a unrestricted lot but was still sued by white neighbors.

Time magazine, in its issue of December 17, 1945, reported:

McDaniel had purchased her white, two-story, seventeen-room house in 1942. The house included a large living room, dining room, drawing room, den, butler's pantry, kitchen, service porch, library, four bedrooms and a basement. McDaniel had a yearly Hollywood party. Everyone knew that the king of Hollywood, Clark Gable, could always be found at McDaniel's parties.

Filmography

Film
Features

Short films

Radio

 Station KOA, Denver, Melony Hounds (1926)
 Station KNX, Los Angeles, The Optimistic Do-Nut Hour (1931)
 CBS Network, The Beulah Show (1947)
 McDaniel was a semi-regular on the radio program Amos 'n' Andy, first as Andy's demanding landlady. In one episode they nearly marry. Andy was out for her money, aided and abetted by the Kingfish, who gives his wife's diamond ring to present to McDaniel as an engagement ring. The scheme blows up in their faces when Sapphire decides to throw a party to celebrate. Andy desperately tries to conceal the ring from Sapphire. In frustration and growing anger, McDaniel says to Andy, "Andy, sweetheart, darlin'. Is you gonna let go of my hand or does I have to pop you??!!" This episode aired on NBC in June 1944. She played a similar character, "Sadie Simpson", in several later episodes.

Discography
Hattie McDaniel recorded infrequently as a singer. In addition to the musical numbers over her long career in films, she recorded for Okeh Records, Paramount, and the small Kansas City, Missouri label Merrit. All of her known recordings (some of which were never issued) were recorded in the 1920s.

See also
 List of African-American firsts
 List of black Academy Award winners and nominees
 List of stars on the Hollywood Walk of Fame

References

Bibliography

 
 Hopper, Hedda. "Hattie Hates Nobody". Chicago Sunday Tribune, 1947.
 Jackson, Carlton. Hattie: The Life of Hattie McDaniel. Lanham, Maryland: Madison Books, 1990. 
 Mitchell, Lisa. "More Than a Mammy". Hollywood Studio Magazine, April 1979.
 Salamon, Julie. "The Courage to Rise Above Mammyness". The New York Times, August 6, 2001.
 Watts, Jill. Hattie McDaniel: Black Ambition, White Hollywood. New York: HarperCollins, 2005. 
 
 
 Zeigler, Ronny. "Hattie McDaniel: '(I'd) ... rather play a maid.'" N.Y. Amsterdam News, April 28, 1979.

Further reading
 
 HISTORY This Week. The Legacy of an Oscar 02/10/2020 W. Burlette Carter and Jill Watts

External links

 
 Hattie and Sam McDaniel papers at Margaret Herrick Library, Academy of Motion Picture Arts and Sciences.

1893 births
1952 deaths
20th-century American actresses
20th-century American comedians
Actors from Wichita, Kansas
Actresses from Kansas
African-American actresses
African-American female comedians
African-American women singer-songwriters
African-American radio personalities
American film actresses
American radio actresses
American television actresses
American women comedians
American blues singer-songwriters
Best Supporting Actress Academy Award winners
Burials at Angelus-Rosedale Cemetery
Comedians from California
Comedians from Kansas
Deaths from breast cancer
Deaths from cancer in California
Musicians from Wichita, Kansas
Okeh Records artists
Paramount Pictures contract players
People from South Los Angeles
People from West Adams, Los Angeles
RKO Pictures contract players
20th-century African-American women singers
Singer-songwriters from Kansas